David Mark Wheatman (31 January 1966 – 24 October 2004) was an English cricketer.  Wheatman was a right-handed batsman who bowled left-arm fast-medium.  He was born in Kendal, Westmorland and was educated at Kendal Grammar School.

Wheatman made his debut for Cumberland in the 1990 Minor Counties Championship against Suffolk.  He played Minor counties cricket for Cumberland infrequently to 2000, including 23 Minor Counties Championship matches and six MCCA Knockout Trophy matches.  Wheatman made his List A against Kent in the 2000 NatWest Trophy.  He played three further List A matches for the county to 2001.  In his four List A matches, he scored 9 runs at a batting average of 4.50, with a high score of 8*.  With the ball he took 2 wickets at a bowling average of 37.50, with best figures of 2/23.

Outside of the county game, he played for Netherfield Cricket Club and was employed as an insurance broker with Talbot Insurance Brokers.  He died in St John's Hospice, Lancaster, Lancashire on 24 October 2004 following a two-year battle with cancer, leaving behind his partner and one daughter.

References

External links
David Wheatman at ESPNcricinfo
David Wheatman at CricketArchive

1966 births
2004 deaths
Sportspeople from Kendal
Cricketers from Cumbria
English cricketers
Cumberland cricketers
Deaths from cancer in England